Sir Robert Hargreaves Rogers (20 January 1850 - 30 November 1924) was Sheriff of the City of London. He was knighted in 1897.

References 

Knights Bachelor
1850 births
1924 deaths
Burials at Highgate Cemetery
Sheriffs of the City of London
British businesspeople